The American way of life or the American way refers to the American nationalist ethos that adheres to the principle of life, liberty and the pursuit of happiness. At the center of the American way is the belief in an American Dream that is claimed to be achievable by any American through hard work. This concept is intertwined with the concept of American exceptionalism, the belief in the unique culture of the nation.

Definition
American writer and intellectual William Herberg offers the following definition of the American way of life:

One commentator notes, "The first half of Herberg's statement still holds true nearly half a century after he first formulated it", even though "Herberg's latter claims have been severely if not completely undermined... materialism no longer needs to be justified in high-sounding terms".

In the National Archives and Records Administration's 1999 Annual Report, National Archivist John W. Carlin writes, "We are different because our government and  our way of life are not based on the divine right of kings, the hereditary privileges of elites, or the enforcement of deference to dictators. They are based on pieces of paper, the Charters of Freedom - the Declaration that asserted our independence, the Constitution that created our government, and the Bill of Rights that established our liberties."

See also

Sources

William Herberg

References

American culture
English phrases
Socio-economic mobility
American exceptionalism